The Liège–Maastricht railway (line 40 in the Belgian numbering plan) is a railway line running from Liège in Belgium to Maastricht in the Netherlands. The line was opened in 1861.

Stations
The main interchange stations on the Liège–Maastricht railway are:

Liège: to Brussels, Aachen, Namur, Luxembourg and Hasselt
Maastricht: to Heerlen, Roermond , Eindhoven, Amsterdam

Local stations are in Bressoux and Visé, Belgium, and in Eijsden and Randwyck on the Dutch side.

Electrification
The line has overhead power at 1,500 V DC in the Netherlands and 3,000 V DC in Belgium; the break of voltage occurs just to the North of the frontier, on Dutch territory.

See also
Line 40 (Infrabel) (in French)

Railway lines in the Netherlands
Railway lines in Belgium
Railway lines opened in 1861
1861 establishments in Belgium
Railway lines in Limburg (Netherlands)
South Limburg (Netherlands)
Transport in Maastricht
Eijsden-Margraten
Visé